The DC Universe Animated Original Movies (DCUAOM; also known as DC Universe Original Movies or DC Universe Movies or DC Animated Movies) are a series of American direct-to-video superhero animated films based on the DC Comics characters and stories.  From 2007 to 2022, films were produced primarily by Warner Bros. Animation, but will fall under DC Studios Animation. Many films are usually stand-alone projects that are either adaptations of popular works or original stories. From 2013 to 2020, the DC Animated Movie Universe was a subset of this series featuring several movies that took place in a shared universe, influenced predominantly by The New 52. They are usually made for an older audience compared to that of the DC Animated Universe and other projects, and also featuring DCAU alumni such as Bruce Timm, who mainly served as executive producer or as producer until Batman: The Dark Knight Returns, before returning for Justice League: Gods and Monsters.

Since it first began with 2007's Superman: Doomsday, the series has been well received by fans, critics, with consistently good sales.

Premise

Unlike earlier animated DC films (most of which also involved Bruce Timm and were part of the DC animated universe), the films in the line are aimed at a more adult audience, often containing profane language, stronger violence, sexual scenes and more mature themes. The art styles for the films are also generally more realistically proportionate. The majority of the films are rated PG-13 by the MPAA with the exception of All-Star Superman and Green Lantern: Emerald Knights, which are rated PG, and Batman: The Killing Joke, Justice League Dark, Batman: Gotham by Gaslight, Suicide Squad: Hell to Pay, Justice League Dark: Apokolips War, Batman: Soul of the Dragon, Batman: The Long Halloween, Part Two, and Injustice, which are rated R. Many of the films are adapted from stories originally featured in DC print comics and graphic novels. , 47 feature films and fourteen short films have been released, with additional films slated for future releases until 2023.

In terms of continuity, the films are usually stand-alone, with exceptions being Batman: Gotham Knight (which takes place between Batman Begins and The Dark Knight), Superman/Batman: Public Enemies and its sequel Superman/Batman: Apocalypse, Justice League: Crisis on Two Earths and its sequel Justice League: Doom, the DC Animated Movie Universe, the Tomorrowverse, and the DCAU-related films Batman and Harley Quinn and Justice League vs. the Fatal Five, which also feature several role reprises from various actors. The usual runtime is around 75 minutes.

From 2007 to 2015, most of the films were voice directed by Andrea Romano, the last one being Justice League: Gods and Monsters, while the films since 2016 starting with Batman: Bad Blood were voice directed by Wes Gleason.

The films are generally released direct-to-video, but Batman: The Killing Joke, Batman and Harley Quinn, The Death of Superman and Reign of the Supermen were also given limited releases in theaters.

Released films

Upcoming

Batman: The Doom That Came to Gotham
Batman: The Doom That Came to Gotham was announced at San Diego Comic-Con on July 22, 2022. Adapted from the comics of the same name. The voice cast will consist of David Giuntoli as Batman, Tati Gabrielle as Kai Li Cain, Christopher Gorham as Oliver Queen, John DiMaggio as James Gordon, Patrick Fabian as Harvey Dent, Brian George as Alfred Pennyworth, Jason Marsden as Dick Grayson and young Bruce Wayne, Karan Brar as Sanjay "Jay" Tawde, David Dastmalchian as Grendon, Navid Negahban as Ra's al Ghul, Emily O'Brien as Talia al Ghul and Martha Wayne, Tim Russ as Lucius Fox, Matthew Waterson as Jason Blood / Etrigan the Demon, Jeffrey Combs as Kirk Langstrom, William Salyers as Oswald Cobblepot, Gideon Adlon as Oracle, and Darin De Paul as Thomas Wayne. It will be released on Blu-ray and digital on March 28, 2023.

Justice League: Warworld
Justice League: Warworld was announced at San Diego Comic-Con on July 22, 2022. It will be part of the Tomorrowverse. It will be released sometime in Summer 2023.

Untitled Milestone Media film
An animated film featuring characters from the Milestone Media imprint was announced at DC Fandome in October 2021. The film will be written by Brandon Thomas and will feature "more than one character" according to Milestone co-founder Denys Cowan. The announcement included promotional concept art of Static, Hardware, Icon, and Rocket.

Short films

DC Showcase

Other short films

Other projects

Unannounced and possible projects
Beyond the list of announced projects, creators involved in various levels at DC Comics have brought up names of possible future projects.

Bruce Timm has said that he would like to do a full-length animated Green Arrow film following the positive reception of DC Showcase: Green Arrow.
DC's ex-executive editor Dan DiDio has expressed interest in seeing the popular 2007–2008 Sinestro Corps War comic storyline adapted.
In 2009, Timm also expressed his interest to make an animated JLA/Avengers adaptation and mentioned the possibility of an animated film of Crisis on Infinite Earths.
Geoff Johns revealed that Warner Bros. would like to use unproduced screenplays as a basis for new animated films, such as J. J. Abrams' Superman: Flyby.
Producer James Tucker has spoken about wanting a Wonder Woman-centered Justice League film.
At Comic-Con, Timm also had expressed interest in an animated adaptation of the Batman R.I.P. storyline.
Batman: The Killing Joke screenwriter Brian Azzarello had stated that he would like to adapt his graphic novel Joker into an animated film.
Timm has mentioned that another Batman Beyond film is a possibility, and in August 2017, Tucker stated in his Twitter account that discussions about a possible Batman Beyond film occur several times at the studio, while he also stated that a potential Static Shock film set in the DC Animated Universe is possible as the studio is always interested in Static.
J. M. DeMatteis expressed interest in scripting an adaptation of his Batman story arc Going Sane and a New Gods film set in the DC Animated Movie Universe. This partially came into play with the film Justice League: Gods and Monsters, visually and aesthetically invoking the DCAU, confirmed to be in an alternate timeline to it.
Filmmaker and comic book writer Kevin Smith mentioned at Calgary Comic and Entertainment Expo that he met with Johns, where he pitched an animated Plastic Man film that he wrote for DC.

Cancelled projects
Plans for sequels to the 2009 films Wonder Woman and Green Lantern: First Flight were shelved, as well as a planned film based on the 2003 miniseries Batgirl: Year One. Slower sales of the Wonder Woman film were cited, although sales figures indicate that it was at least the #8 best-selling of the 25 DC Universe films released  (4 of the films that ranked higher than it include Blu-ray sales which have not been released for Wonder Woman).

In 2010, Timm stated that the production team originally planned to make an Aquaman film, but at the end, the executives of Warner Bros. cancelled the project because their expectations about marketing were very low.

During an interview in October 2016, Jay Oliva revealed that he had an idea for a sequel to Batman: Assault on Arkham, but following Oliva's departure from Warner Bros. Animation in 2017, the project may have been pulled.

Reception

Sales performance
Sales figures below represent, when available, DVD and Blu-ray sales in the United States. Theatrical ticket, digital, and rental sales are not included.

Critical response
Each film is linked to the "Critical response" section of its article.

Continuities

Stand-alone films
The following films are stand-alone, and do not share continuity with each other or other films (note exceptions)

Superman: Doomsday (2007)
Justice League: The New Frontier (2008)
 Wonder Woman (2009)
Green Lantern: First Flight (2009)
Batman: Under the Red Hood (2010)
Batman: Death in the Family (interactive short) (2020)
All-Star Superman (2011)
Green Lantern: Emerald Knights (2011)
Superman vs. The Elite (2012)
Superman: Unbound (2013)
Justice League: Gods and Monsters (2015)
Justice League: Gods and Monsters Chronicles (web series) (2015)
Batman: The Killing Joke (2016)
Batman: Gotham by Gaslight (2018)
Superman: Red Son (2020)
Batman: Soul of the Dragon (2021)
 Injustice (2021)
Catwoman: Hunted (2022)
Batman and Superman: Battle of the Super Sons (2022)
Batman: The Doom That Came To Gotham (2023)

Superman/Batman
This continuity is based on the Superman/Batman storyline.

Superman/Batman: Public Enemies (2009)
Superman/Batman: Apocalypse (2010)

Justice League (JLA)
This continuity is based on JLA storylines published in 2000.

Justice League: Crisis on Two Earths (2010)
Justice League: Doom (2012)

Dark Knight Returns
This continuity is based on Frank Miller's Batman: Year One arc and The Dark Knight Returns.

Batman: Year One (2011)
DC Showcase: Catwoman (short film) (2011)
Batman: The Dark Knight Returns Pt. 1 (2012)
Batman: The Dark Knight Returns Pt. 2 (2013)

DC Animated Movie Universe

A shared universe, with influences from The New 52 continuity and various DC eras and productions.

Justice League: The Flashpoint Paradox (2013)
Justice League: War (2014)
Son of Batman (2014)
Justice League: Throne of Atlantis (2015)
Nightwing and Robin (45 second short film) (2015)
Batman vs. Robin (2015)
Batman: Bad Blood (2016)
Justice League vs. Teen Titans (2016)
Justice League Dark (2017)
Constantine: City of Demons (web series later compiled into a film) (2018)
Teen Titans: The Judas Contract (2017)
Suicide Squad: Hell to Pay (2018)
Suicide Squad: Hell to Pay (sequel comic) (2018)
The Death of Superman (2018)
The Death of Superman: Part 1 (prequel/sequel comic) (2018)
Reign of the Supermen (2019)
Batman: Hush (2019)
Wonder Woman: Bloodlines (2019)
Justice League Dark: Apokolips War (2020)
Constantine: The House of Mystery (short film) (2022)

Tomorrowverse

A shared universe, with influences from various DC eras and productions.

 Superman: Man of Tomorrow (2020)
 Justice Society: World War II (2021)
 Kamandi: The Last Boy on Earth! (short film) (2021)
 Batman: The Long Halloween, Part One (2021)
 Batman: The Long Halloween, Part Two (2021)
 Green Lantern: Beware My Power (2022)
 Adam Strange (short film) (2020)
 Legion of Super-Heroes (2023)
 Justice League: Warworld (2023)

DC Animated Universe 
 This continuity is set in the DC Animated Universe (although the canonicity is open-ended)
Batman and Harley Quinn (2017)
Justice League vs. the Fatal Five (2019)

Other universes
 Batman: Gotham Knight (set in the Nolanverse, although it is not necessarily considered canon) (2008)
 Batman: Assault on Arkham (set in the Arkhamverse) (2014)

References

External links
 DCUonDVD.com - The Official Website for DC Universe Animated Movies
 DCUAOM @ World's Finest
 DC Universe Animated Movies @ BatmanYTB.com
 DCUAOM @ Legions of Gotham

 
American animated films
Film series introduced in 2007
2000s English-language films
2010s English-language films
2020s English-language films